Yacuma is a province in the Beni Department in Bolivia. Its seat is Santa Ana del Yacuma.

Subdivision 
Yacuma Province is divided into two municipalities which are partly further subdivided into cantons.

Places of interest 
 Beni Biological Station Biosphere Reserve
 Lake Huaytunas

References 

Provinces of Beni Department